The Chapel House is a two-story, Arts and Crafts-style house built in 1910 and located in  Guilderland, New York on the southern edge of the Uptown Campus of the University at Albany (SUNY Albany).

It was listed on the National Register of Historic Places in 1982.  The listing included one contributing building on a  area.

Notes

Houses on the National Register of Historic Places in New York (state)
Houses completed in 1910
Houses in Albany County, New York
Guilderland, New York
Bungalow architecture in New York (state)
American Craftsman architecture in New York (state)
National Register of Historic Places in Albany County, New York